Foça Islands is an island group in the Bay of Izmir, Turkey, outside the town of Foça. The largest island is Orak. The island group also includes Fener Ada, Incir Ada and Metalik Ada.

Foça Islands
Azaplar Islets (Venedik Kayaları, Merminci, Vráchoi Mermígkia, Vrákhoi Mermíngia, Myrmikes, Myrmingia, Myrmikia, Myrminkies, Μυρμικες (Karıncalar), Μυρμίγγια, Μυρμηγκιά, Μυρμηκία, Μυρμηγκιές)
Fener Island (Oğlak, Middle, Elaiousa, Partheni, Ελαιούσα, Ογλάκ, Παρθένι)
Hayırsız Island (Atatürk Adası, Karteria, Χαϊρσίζ, Καρτερία)
İncir Island (Sağır, Sağırada, Sagir, Aya Yorgi, St George's, Hagios Georgios, Hagios Giorgios, Ágios Geórgios, Bakkheion, Bacchium, Bacchina, Bakchos, Bakatanisi, Bakchou Nesos, Vakcheion, Βακχείον, Αη Γιώργη, Άγιος Γεώργιος, Αγίου Γεωργίου, Άγιος Γεώργιος)
Kartdere Island (Güvercin)
Kedi Ferdi Islet (Kedi Ferdi'nin Adası, Cat Ferdi's Island, Sekiz (Eight))
Metelik Island (Metalik, Metallic, Piti Kayalığı, Pita, Pide, Πήτα)
Orak Island (Drepanon, Drepano, Drepani, Great Fokia, Rephia, Megalonisi, Alopeki, Μεγάλο Νησί, Αλωπεκή, Δρέπανον, Δρέπανο, Δρεπάνι)
Eşek Islet (Kalorrizitis, Καλορριζίτης)

Archipelagoes of Turkey
Islands of İzmir Province
Gulf of İzmir